Carolina Costa (born 25 August 1994) is an Italian female judoka and paralympic athlete. She won one of the bronze medals in the women's +70 kg event at the 2020 Summer Paralympics held in Tokyo, Japan.

Biography
Daughter of the Sicilian master Judo and president of the Italian Kendo Federation Franco Costa, who died in 2006, Carolina Costa began her under-23 judoka career in a very promising way with some brilliant results even at an absolute level, like a second place in the Italian championships.

In 2016, at the age of 22 she was diagnosed with keratoconus, a degenerative disease that if taken at a young age can lead to progressive blindness, therefore Carolina's performance is diminishing, it becomes necessary to switch to paralympic sport and here, however that, as a paralympic athlete, she achieves international results, like a bronze medal at the world championships and a gold medal at the European championships. These results give her the almost certainty of being able to represent Italy at the 2020 Summer Paralympics in Tokyo. She is the daughter of the Olympic former freestyle wrestler Katarzyna Juszczak.

Achievements

See also
 International Blind Sports Federation
 FIJLKAM

References

External links
 Carolina Costa at CIP web site 
 Carolina Costa at Judoinside.com

1994 births
Living people
Italian female judoka
Paralympic judoka of Italy
Sportspeople from Messina
Judoka at the 2020 Summer Paralympics
Medalists at the 2020 Summer Paralympics
Paralympic bronze medalists for Italy
Paralympic medalists in judo
21st-century Italian women